The Western Suburbs RFC, or Wests Roosters, is a rugby union club based in Wellington, New Zealand. Wests is a constituent club of the Wellington Rugby Football Union. The club was founded in 1983 as an amalgamation of the Athletic, Karori and Onslow rugby clubs. Wests won the Jubilee Cup in 1998 and the Hardham Cup in 2000, and 2003.

Location
Wests is based at Ian Galloway Park in Wilton, Wellington City, and features four full-size grounds and four junior grounds, club rooms and gymnasium with an indoor artificial surface for wet weather training.

Club Membership
Wests was formerly one of the 12 Premier Clubs in Wellington, and fielded a number of senior teams. After a judicial issue, the premier team was removed from the top-tier competition. This then had a roll down effect and the adult portion of the club was essentially abandoned. West's senior club now consists of two teams; reserve grade (mixed veges) and a presidents teams. A sad end (definitely in their twilight years) to a once good club.

The Wests's Juniors are in the top ten for size in New Zealand with over 500 members (children under 13 years) from the local region including the Brooklyn, Karori, Ngaio, Khandallah, Wilton, Wadestown and Northland areas.

Notable players
International and Super Rugby players:
 Scott Crichton – All Black (1983–85)
 Alama Ieremia – Samoan international (1992–93), and All Black (1994–2000) playing 30 tests
 Filo Tiatia – All Black (2000)
 Rodney So'oialo – All Black (2002–09). 62 Tests (5 tests as captain)
 Kane Thompson – Samoan international (2007– ), and Chiefs super rugby (2012)
 Scott Fuglistaller – Highlanders (2012), and Melbourne Rebels (2013– ) super rugby
Norm Hadley  - Canadian International (1989-1993)

References

Rugby clubs established in 1983
Sport in Wellington
New Zealand rugby union teams
Rugby union in the Wellington Region